The women's 1500 metres at the 2017 Asian Athletics Championships was held on 6 and 7 July.

Medalists

Results

Heats

Qualification rule: First 5 in each heat (Q) and the next 2 fastest (q) qualified for the final.

Final

References

1500
1500 metres at the Asian Athletics Championships